James Leusink (born April 13, 1990), better known by his alias Ephixa (sometimes stylised as ephixa), is a Canadian electronic music producer who lives in Ontario, Canada. He is best known for his viral "Charlie Sheen Bi-Winning" dubstep remix, remixes of music from the Legend of Zelda franchise as well as various other remixes and original electronic music. Leusink peaked at #11 on Billboard's Next Big Sound chart in November 2011.

Early life
Leusink was born on April 13, 1990. His interest in music started when he was 8 years old, playing the keyboard without prior lessons. He got his first guitar several years later, began taking lessons, and joined various bands. Leusink's work in electronic music began while he was developing video games in his spare time, desired to create a soundtrack for his various games. Originally influenced by hardstyle artists such as Alphaverb, Showtek, and Evil Activities, Leusink has used the digital audio workstation FL Studio to produce his music.

Career

2010 to 2011: Zelda Step, "Charlie Sheen Bi-Winning Dubstep", and "Sanctuary"
On April 10, 2010, Leusink released his second album, Zelda Step. The album featured remixes of "Lost Woods", "Song of Storms" and "Gerudo Valley" from The Legend of Zelda: Ocarina of Time, as well as a remix of "Dragon Roost Island" from The Legend of Zelda: The Wind Waker. The album received mixed to positive reviews, with Jade Royal of Sputnikmusic giving the album a 3.5 out of 5 rating, stating "It's a thin line that Ephixa treads with 'Zelda Step', but one that ultimately pleases more than disdains". Elton Jones of Complex later placed Leusink's remix of "Lost Woods" as the best remix of a video game theme song, finalising his review of the song with "The Legend of Zelda Lost Woods theme mixed with dubstep sounds incredible."

On March 2, 2011, Leusink released "Charlie Sheen Bi-Winning Dubstep", a remix featuring footage of Charlie Sheen from an interview originally broadcast on American TV series 20/20. Within two days of its release, the remix had been viewed over 700,000 times and received over 7,500 likes on YouTube, becoming one of the site's most popular and viral videos at the time.

On September 19, 2011, Leusink released his dubstep remix of the song "Sanctuary", originally by English trance producer Gareth Emery. The remix was included in an extended play based on the original song, titled Sanctuary (The Remixes). When reviewing the extended play, a writer for DJ Mag commented on Leusink's remix, stating that he had gone for a "twitchy, spasmodic bit of dubstep-ery, which is ok, of the type". In the week of November 5, 2011, Leusink entered and peaked at number 11 on Billboard's Next Big Sound chart.

2012 to 2015: Monstercat, Hiatus, "Catfish", and "Machina"
On August 3, 2012, Leusink released "Awesome To The Max", which the Your EDM staff described as "heavy but laid back, and a gift for fans of dubstep and Monstercat alike". On August 25, Leusink collaborated with American producer Varien and Canadian duo Project 46 to release "The Anthem". The collaboration was released alongside an animated music video to celebrate Monstercat's one year anniversary. Both "Awesome To The Max" and "The Anthem" appeared on Monstercat's ninth compilation album, Monstercat 009 – Reunion. Both songs were later featured on Monstercat's Best of 2012 compilation album.

In November 2012, Leusink left Monstercat, continuing to release music independently. On November 16, he released "Fuck The System", a mashup of himself, Deadmau5, TVDS, and Showtek. The song was released to promote "Fuck the 9to5 jobs". On January 17, 2013, Leusink released "Unraveled Reality", which Steve Jacobs of EDM Sauce wrote that the track "offers a bit of a soothing feel along with some big drum sounds". In 2013, Leusink went on hiatus. During a Reddit AMA, The Monstercat staff were questioned about what happened to Leusink, which they answered:

On June 30, 2014, a year after he released "Unraveled Reality" and almost two years after he released "The Anthem", Leusink independently released "Catfish". EDMTunes''' James Brannigan noted the song for its minimalist trance progression, later writing that as soon as "the drop hits, Ephixa brings back the sound he used to win all of our hearts with as he did in his dubstep remix of 'Song of Storms'".

On February 5, 2015, Leusink released his remix of American electronic producer Dex Arson's song "Machina" as part of the latter's extended play Welcome to War. Writing for EDMTunes, James Brannigan noted the remix for its diversity and described it as "bearing a resemblance to Excision’s style". Matthew Meadow of Your EDM wrote that Luesink had transformed the original song into a "genre-hopping, deep and rumbling tune bound to blow your speakers", later stating that the synths used were "wonderfully bubbly and sinister at the same time, allowing for an extremely diverse and layered track, just the kind of thing I live for".

2016 to 2017: Return to Monstercat and subsequent releases

On July 4, 2016, nearly 4 years after his last release on Monstercat, Leusink collaborated with Stephen Walking to release "Matches" as part of Monstercat's 5 Year Anniversary, featuring Aaron Richards as vocals. The collaboration was previously featured in Leusink's 2014 mini-mix Wip Rip Reel under the working title "Old Dennis". At the time, Leusink stated that the track would "most likely never" be finished. The song was later voted by fans to be featured as part of Monstercat's Best of 2016 compilation album.

On February 2, 2017, Leusink collaborated with Laura Brehm to release "Losing You" on Monstercat. Billie-Darian Hollyhead of Playing With Sound called the song a "beautiful progressive house track", noting Brehms' vocals as "truly stunning as they lay on top of the oscillating beats". The song was later featured as part of Monstercat's Best of 2017 compilation album. On August 19, 2017, Leusink appeared on Laura Brehm's remix album Breathe EP Remixes.

On July 5, 2017, Leusink released the song "Skyforth" as part of Rocket League x Monstercat Vol. 1, the first collaborative album between Monstercat and San Diego-based video game developer Psyonix. The song appeared in the in-game soundtrack of Psyonix's 2015 video game Rocket League, alongside 17 other songs by various artists including Slushii, Aero Chord, Vicetone, Tristam, and Rogue.

On October 26, 2017, Leusink collaborated with Laura Brehm to release "Deja Vu" on the latter's own record label Electric Bird Records. Your EDM's Landon Fleury compared the song to Leusink's previous song "Skyforth", wring that the tack "sees Ephixa continuing down the house path in a similar way to his song 'Skyforth', but with a distinctly stronger groove and fresh vocal chops to top everything off". Fleury later noted Brehm's vocals as ones that "really soar, elevating the production to its maximum potential".

On December 13, 2017, Leusink collaborated with electronic music producer Bossfight to release "Subside" on Monstercat. Writing for Your EDM, Landon Fleury wrote about the song's influences from various electronic dance music genres including chiptune, synthwave, bass house, and trap, stating that the song "sees Ephixa turning back to the heavier-leaning sound his musical career was founded on, diving into electro at full power" and concluding his review by writing "Simply said, it’s a variety of different sounds and styles that somehow fit together perfectly in the end". The song was later featured on Monstercat Uncaged Vol. 4, the first compilation album released by Monstercat since their Uncaged and Instinct re-branding in January earlier in the year. The song appeared on Monstercat's Best of 2018 compilation album.

2018 to present: "Dreamstate", "Sundance", and Monstercat's 8 Year Anniversary Adventure
On August 10, 2018, Leusink released "Dreamstate" on Monstercat. A writer of T.H.E - Music Essentials described the song as a refresh of Leusink's style, writing that the song production has been made "very thoughtfully and yet, allows one to freely flow through its rhythms." The song was later featured as part of Monstercat's second Instinct series compilation album titled Monstercat Instinct Vol. 2, alongside 39 other songs by various artists, including The Night, Fwlr, Julian Calor, and Vicetone.

On June 11, 2019, Leusink collaborated with electronic music producer Heartful to release the synthwave song "Sundance". The song was later added to the video game Rocket League as part the second phase of the latter's Radical Summer in-game event. Leusink and Heartful were joined by other Monstercat artists included in the update, including 7 Minutes Dead, Desert Star, Televisor, Tut Tut Child, Varien, and Wrld.

On July 1, Leusink collaborated with Canadian DJ and Producer Going Quantum to release the drum and bass song "Let's Roll." The next day, Leusink collaborated with Stephen Walking to release the song "Problems". Both songs were released as part of Monstercat's 8 Year Anniversary album, titled Monstercat's 8 Year Anniversary Adventure, released on July 12.

On November 17, 2020, Animated electronic music duo Half an Orange released their extended play Mostly We Grow Pt. 3.'' Their electro-rock collaboration with Leusink, "Time Travel Kool Aid", was included as the first song on the extended play.

Discography

Albums and EPs

As a featured artist

Singles

Remixes

Awards and nominations

Accolades

References

Canadian electronic musicians
Dubstep musicians
Hardstyle musicians
Canadian trance musicians
Synthwave musicians
Future house musicians
Canadian house musicians
Monstercat artists
NoCopyrightSounds artists
1990 births
Living people
Musicians from Ontario
Canadian DJs
YouTube channels launched in 2008